The Spectacular Spider-Man is an American animated television series based on the Marvel Comics character, Spider-Man, produced by Culver Entertainment, Adelaide Productions and Sony Pictures Television in association with Marvel, and developed for television by Greg Weisman and Victor Cook. In terms of tone and style, the series is based principally on the Stan Lee/Steve Ditko/John Romita Sr. era of The Amazing Spider-Man comics, with a similar balance of action, drama and comedy as well as a high school setting. However, it also tends to utilize material from all eras of the comic's run and other sources such as the Ultimate Spider-Man comics by Brian Michael Bendis & Mark Bagley, as well as the original Spider-Man movie trilogy directed by Sam Raimi. The series premiered on March 8, 2008 during the Kids' WB programming block of The CW, and its second season aired on Disney XD in the United States, and ended its run on November 18, 2009, while the entire series was broadcast in Canada on Teletoon.

The series is broken up into loose arcs, each consisting of three to four episodes that take place roughly over a month within the series. The series is themed around the "Education of Peter Parker" according to Greg Weisman, with the episode titles in each arc adopting terms from specific fields of study in high school. Both Season One and Two consist of 13 episodes.

Series overview

Episodes

Season 1 (2008)
The first three episodes are named after notions in biology, the next three are named after ones in economics, the following three are terms in chemistry, while the final four are notions in psychology.

Season 2 (2009)
The first four episodes are named after notions from engineering, the next three are named after ones in human development, the following three are terms in criminology, while the final three are drama terminologies.

References

External links

Spectacular Spider-Man
 
Lists of American children's animated television series episodes